The Tokyo Sports Film Award for Special Film Award is an award given at the Tokyo Sports Film Award. This award is established in 2004.

List of winners

References

External links
 

Awards established in 2004
Japanese film awards
Recurring events established in 2004
2004 establishments in Japan
Tokyo Sports Film Award
Lists of films by award